"I'm Sorry" is the fourteenth single by Peach Tree Rascals, released by Homemade Projects and 10K Projects on July 14, 2020.

Background and composition 
The song created after the release of "Mariposa (Acoustic)," and was previewed on Digital FORT. The song features acoustic guitars, bass guitar, and organs, with the song itself being framed as an apology. The song discusses themes of escapism and isolation, as well as moving on from what's familiar.
When asked about the song, producer Dom Pizano said that "[The song] is about owning your mistakes and taking responsibility, but also accepting something bad happened and allowing yourself to move on." Rapper-singer Tarrek Abdel-Khaliq stated that “The song also speaks to that feeling when you're sorry for yourself, it's sort of like a get up and move on. There's no point in holding on to the bad, it brings you and all the people around you down.”

Olazaba also said that he tried to visualize being yourself was to make it so that it "would be an open road with hitchhikers and everyone who seems lost at the start. But at the end of it, they're all together singing along in the car because they all found themselves and truly the most happiness."

Music video 
The music video was directed by Jorge Olazaba. It was shot in a desert in Southern California, as Olazaba wanted a "wide empty area to instill that feeling of unknowing-ness and of redemption that the song." The group spent more money from the budget so that the video could include drone shots and "nicer cameras."

Critical reception 
The song was well received, with Ones to Watch calling it "a wistful moment of fluid contemplation that feels simultaneously reflective and hopeful for the future."

References 

2020 singles
Peach Tree Rascals songs